The traditional Burmese units of measurement were a system of measurement used in Myanmar.

Myanmar was one of three countries that had not adopted the International System of Units (SI) metric system as their official system of weights and measures according to the 2010 CIA Factbook. However, in June 2011, U Kyaw Htoo from the Burmese government's Ministry of Commerce began discussing proposals to reform the measurement system in Burma and adopt the kilogram for domestic trade, reasoning that this would simplify foreign trade which it conducts exclusively in metric; and in October 2013, Pwint San, Deputy Minister for Commerce, announced that the country was preparing to adopt the metric system.

, Burmese government web pages in English used imperial and metric units inconsistently. For instance, the Ministry of Construction used miles to describe the length of roads and square feet for the size of houses, but square kilometres for the total land area of new town developments in Yangon City.  the Ministry of Agriculture used acres for land areas.  the Ministry of Foreign Affairs used kilometres (with mile equivalents in parentheses) to describe the dimensions of the country.

Length

Mass

Volume

Money

Adoption of SI (metric) system
In October 2013, the Ministry of Commerce announced that Myanmar was preparing to adopt the International System of Units (SI) as the country's official system of measurement.

Examples of metrication in Myanmar include weather forecasts by the Department of Meteorology and Hydrology being given with temperatures in Celsius. Petrol in Myanmar is sold with prices in Burmese kyat per litre (K/L). Speed limits in Myanmar are given by law in kilometres per hour (km/h).

References

Bibliography

See also 
 Myanmar
 Burmese alphabet
 Burmese language

Customary units of measurement
Systems of units
Units Of Measurement
Economy of Myanmar
Burmese culture
Units of measurement by country